Mad Mouse is a steel roller coaster located at Michigan's Adventure in Muskegon, Michigan. It was manufactured by Arrow Dynamics. Mad Mouse was the park's third steel roller coaster Woodstock Express (then known as Big Dipper) also opened the same year). Mad Mouse has orange track, a red lift hill, and yellow supports as of a 2022 repaint. It is also the tallest wild mouse roller coaster. The coaster was built on a location within the park that was previously used as the park's main entrance.

External links

Official page

Roller coasters in Michigan
Roller coasters introduced in 1999
Michigan's Adventure
Roller coasters operated by Cedar Fair